Fixed-width typeface may refer to:

 a monospaced typeface with characters of uniform width
 a duospaced typeface with characters of full-width and half-width

Typesetting